The Third Zone District of Moanda lies south of the city of Moanda, Gabon. It is isolated from the city by the Miosso Swamp and its only connection remains the Moanda-Bakoumba road, which passes between Mounts Moanda and Boundinga and continues to the border with Congo-Brazzaville.

Geography
The Third Zone District is home to Rigobert Landji Public High School, the largest high school in Moanda. The high school is built on a previously unoccupied plateau, making Moanda a town built on four plateaus.

References 

 Economist Intelligence Unit (Great Britain) (1993). Country report: Gabon, Equatorial Guinea. The Unit. p. 1. Retrieved 31 October 2011.
 "Moanda Climate Normals 1961–1990". National Oceanic and Atmospheric Administration. Retrieved 8 March 2015.

Populated places in Haut-Ogooué Province